Abbott's Meat is a meat packing company located in Flint, Michigan.  Koegel's hot dogs are considered by the authors of "Coney Detroit" as only acceptable hot dog for a Flint-Style Coney Dog along with Abbott's coney sauce. Abbott's chili sauce's primary ingredient is ground beef heart.

History
Abbott's Meat started in 1907 on the University of Michigan-Flint parking ramp's future site. When the Flint-style coney began in the 1920s, Abbott's began making coney sauce.

In July 2007, Abbott's Meat, had voluntarily recalled 26,600 pounds of meat products due to a possible E. coli contamination.  E. coli was detected by regular testing with no reported illnesses. All Halo Burger locations were shut down for a day due to the recall.

References

Manufacturing companies based in Michigan
Meat companies of the United States
Companies based in Flint, Michigan
Michigan culture
Food and drink companies established in 1907
1907 establishments in Michigan
Brand name hot dogs
Food and drink companies based in Michigan